Local elections were held in Zamboanga City on May 10, 2010 within the Philippine general election. The voters elect for the elective local posts in the city: the mayor, vice mayor, and eight councilors per district.

Summary
Incumbent Mayor Celso Lobregat decided to run for a last third term for the mayorship. Incumbent Vice-Mayor Mannix Dalipe runs against Lobregat under the banner of the Nationalist People's Coalition.

Lobregat picks District II Councilor Cesar Iturralde as his running mate. Dalipe picks former Monsignor Crisanto dela Cruz as his running mate. Dela Cruz previously fought Lobregat for the mayorship last 2007 but lost.

Results
The candidates for mayor and vice mayor with the highest number of votes wins the seat; they are voted separately, therefore, they may be of different parties when elected.

Mayoral elections
Incumbent Mayor Celso Lobregat is in his second term and is eligible for reelection.

Vice-mayoral elections
Incumbent Vice-Mayor Manuel Jose "Mannix" Dalipe was an Independent before running for mayor under the banner of Nationalist People's Coalition.

City Council elections
Each of Zamboanga City's two legislative districts elects eight councilors to the City Council. The eight candidates with the highest number of votes wins the seats per district.

1st  District

|-bgcolor=black
|colspan=5|

2nd  District

|-bgcolor=black
|colspan=5|

Edding-Alavar dispute
Miguel Alavar III, defeated candidate of the Laban ng Demokratikong Pilipino for the city council's second district, together with Roseller Natividad petitioned for the annulment of the proclamation and correction of errors in the election returns, canvassing of votes and tabulation against the board of election inspectors (BEI) of precincts 371 of Barangay Talon-Talon and precinct 394 of Barangay Tetuan, the City Board of Canvassers proclaimed Al-Jihan Edding as winner by 6 votes.

On March 28, 2011 the City Board of Canvassers as directed by the Commission on Elections  nullified the proclamation of Edding and declared Alavar as the rightful 8th member of the Sangguniang Panglungsod.

References

http://www.gmanetwork.com/news/eleksyon2010/provincialcount/zamboanga_del_sur

External links
Official website of the Commission on Elections
 Official website of National Movement for Free Elections (NAMFREL)
Official website of the Parish Pastoral Council for Responsible Voting (PPCRV)

Elections in Zamboanga City
2010 Philippine local elections